The Oval Office Tapes is a scripted podcast that imagines what the conversations in the White House might sound like. The show was created by documentary filmmaker R.J. Cutler. The executive producers are R.J. Cutler, Scott Conroy, and Jason Blum. The producer is Trevor Smith. The writers are R.J. Cutler, Scott Conroy, Lesley Hollingsworth, and Mike Schneider. The podcast is a production of Blumhouse Productions, Cadence13, and Cutler Productions. The show premiered in 2018, and made its live-taping debut at Politicon 2018.

R.J. Cutler describes coming up with the idea for the podcast: "I'm not alone, I think, these days in being fairly obsessed with what's going on in Washington D.C., what's happening at 1600 Pennsylvania Ave., and it occurred to me that if we could hear what was going on within the rooms there, the private rooms, it'd be very interesting, and that's what The Oval Office Tapes is."

Format

In an interview with Hollywood Reporter, R.J. Cutler described the production of the podcast, "We write every Monday, Tuesday, Wednesday, we record on Thursday, and we drop on Friday." Each episode contains segments telling the story behind the week's news. Instead of reading copy directly from the advertisers, The Oval Office Tapes employs the Ghost of Abraham Lincoln, Totally Real Paid Protestors, and the Backbone of the Republican Party to read the advertisements.

Critical response

The show premiered to positive critical response, with praise from celebrities such as Alec Baldwin and James Carville. The Hollywood Reporter called it, "comedic gold." In April 2019, it gained a nomination for the Webby Awards for Best Comedy Podcast.

Episodes

Cast

Mary Birdsong
Nicole Collins
Ian James Corlett
Chris Cox (voice actor)
Quinton Flynn
Melvin Jackson Jr.
David Kaye (voice actor)
Bruce Locke
Brendan McKay
Scott McCord
Danielle Morrow
Jeff Rector
Jonathan Von Mering
Phillip Wilburn

References

External links 

2018 podcast debuts
Political podcasts